The 2012 President's Cup Women's singles was a professional tennis tournament played on outdoor hard courts in Astana, Kazakhstan.

Vitalia Diatchenko would be the defending champion, but chose not to participate.

Maria João Koehler won the title defeating Marta Sirotkina in the final 7–5, 6–2.

Seeds

Draw

Finals

Top half

Bottom half

References 
Main Draw
Qualifying Draw

President's Cup (tennis) - Singles